Gusztáv Leikep (born August 19, 1966) is a Hungarian sprint canoer who competed in the late 1980s and early 1990s. He won three silver medals at the ICF Canoe Sprint World Championships with a one in the C-4 500 m (1990) and two in the C-4 1000 m (1989, 1990).

Leikep also finished seventh in the C-2 1000 m event at the 1988 Summer Olympics in Seoul.

References

Sports-reference.com profile

1966 births
Canoeists at the 1988 Summer Olympics
Hungarian male canoeists
Living people
Olympic canoeists of Hungary
ICF Canoe Sprint World Championships medalists in Canadian
20th-century Hungarian people